is a former Japanese football player and manager who is the current head coach of the Singapore national football team.

Playing career
Nishigaya was born in Shizuoka on May 12, 1973. After graduating from University of Tsukuba, he joined J1 League club Nagoya Grampus Eight with teammate Shigeyoshi Mochizuki in 1996. He mostly played as a center back during that first season. In 1998, he moved to Avispa Fukuoka. He became a regular player as the left back of a three back defense. In 1999, he moved to Verdy Kawasaki, where he didn't play much. In 2000, he moved to JEF United Ichihara. Here, too, he did not play much. In 2001, he moved to J2 League club Albirex Niigata. There he played a variety of positions, such as defensive midfielder, center back and left side back. He retired at the end of the 2001 season.

Coaching career
After retiring, Nishigaya started his coaching career at his alma mater, University of Tsukuba, in 2003. In 2004, he signed with Tokyo Verdy. He coached for their youth team until 2009. In 2010, he became a manager for Meiji University. In 2012, he signed with Albirex Niigata and became a coach under manager Hisashi Kurosaki. However he resigned with Kurosaki in May. In 2013, he signed with Mito HollyHock and became a coach under manager Tetsuji Hashiratani. In June 2015, Hashiratani was sacked and Nishigaya took over the team. He managed the club until 2017. In 2018, he moved to SC Sagamihara and managed the club for one season.
In 2022 he was appointed as the manager of the Singapore national team. He led Singapore team to a disappointing AFF Cup, depsite a narrow win against Laos and Myanmar, a scoreless draw with Vietnam, the Lions failed to qualify to the semi-finals after a heavy defeat 4-1 away loss against Malaysia.
Despite calls for him to be replaced, the Football Association of Singapore has not done so due to reasons unknown.

Club statistics

Managerial statistics

References

External links
 
 

1973 births
Living people
University of Tsukuba alumni
Association football people from Shizuoka Prefecture
Japanese footballers
J1 League players
J2 League players
Nagoya Grampus players
Avispa Fukuoka players
Tokyo Verdy players
JEF United Chiba players
Albirex Niigata players
Japanese football managers
J2 League managers
J3 League managers
Mito HollyHock managers
SC Sagamihara managers
Association football midfielders